Chilamakur is a village in Kadapa district of the Indian state of Andhra Pradesh, It is located in Yerraguntla mandal of Kadapa revenue division.

References

External links 
 India Cements asked to check pollution
 Fire at India Cements' Chilamkur plant
 AP defends ST sop to India Cements

Villages in Kadapa district